Awutu-Senya is one of the constituencies represented in the Parliament of Ghana. It elects one Member of Parliament (MP) by the first past the post system of election. Cape Coast constituency is located in the Cape Coast Municipal district of the Central Region of Ghana.

Boundaries
The seat is located entirely within the Cape Coast Municipal district of the Central Region of Ghana.

Members of Parliament 

The constituency was split into the Cape Coast North and Cape Coast South constituencies in 2012.

Elections

See also
List of Ghana Parliament constituencies
Cape Coast Municipal District
Cape Coast

References 

Parliamentary constituencies in the Central Region (Ghana)